Duell, Sloan and Pearce was a publishing company located in New York City. It was founded in 1939 by C. Halliwell Duell, Samuel Sloan and Charles A. Pearce. It initially published general fiction and non-fiction, but not westerns, light romances or children's books. It published works by many prominent authors, including Archibald MacLeish, John O'Hara, Erskine Caldwell (including his American Folkways series) Anaïs Nin, Conrad Aiken, Wallace Stegner, E. E. Cummings, Howard Fast, Benjamin Spock, Joseph Jay Deiss and William Bradford Huie. In addition to their literary list, the firm published many works of military history, with a focus on aviation in the war years.

Duell, Sloan and Pearce soon became sales agent for Musette Publishers, which had a line of children's books. The firm also published photographic essays, including the U.S. Camera annuals. U.S. Camera 1941 was banned in Boston because it contained photographs of nudes. In 1942, the firm agreed to handle all advertising, promotion, selling and distribution of Eagle Books titles. The firm later added the Essential Books and Bloodhound Mysteries divisions. In 1947, they introduced the New American Naturalist series, which was intended to provide a comprehensive survey of American flora and fauna for the general reader. Arrowhead Books was later added as an independent subsidiary of Duell, Sloan and Pearce.

In 1951, Duell, Sloan and Pearce entered into an agreement with Little, Brown and Company for Little, Brown to handle the manufacturing, warehousing, promotion and selling of all Duell, Sloan and Pearce titles. The two firms remained independent, but the books carried both imprints. In 1956, Duell, Sloan and Pearce terminated the arrangement with Little, Brown, and joined the McKay Group, a cooperative selling and manufacturing association in New York. In March 1961 Duell, Sloan and Pearce became an affiliate of Meredith Publishing Company. In 1967, Meredith announced that all affiliated imprints, including Duell, Sloan and Pearce, would no longer be used. The rights to Duell, Sloan and Pearce books were sold by Meredith to the independent publisher Hawthorn Books in 1969. After Hawthorn closed in 1977, the rights to its titles were acquired by E. P. Dutton.

See also
 Appleton-Century-Crofts

References 

 Harry Thompson (1986). "Duell, Sloan and Pearce". In Peter Dzwonkoski (ed.), "American Literary Publishing Houses, 1900–1980: Trade and Paperback", pp. 127–9, Dictionary of Literary Biography, Volume Forty-six. Detroit, Michigan. Gale Research Company. .

Defunct book publishing companies of the United States
Companies based in New York City
Publishing companies disestablished in 1967
Publishing companies established in 1939
1939 establishments in New York City